The Putrajaya International Convention Centre (PICC) is the main convention centre of the Federal Territory of Putrajaya. PICC rises majestically from the top of Putrajaya's highest point in Precinct 5 and occupies an area of 135,000 square meters. The building which began construction in 2001 and was completed in September 2003, is designed by fourth prime minister Mahathir Mohamad to look like the eye of pending perak (a silver Malay royal belt buckle). It was renamed from the Putrajaya Convention Centre in October 2004 to its present name to reflect its international status on par with conference centres in world-class cities such London, Tokyo and Paris.

Notable events held there included 10th Islamic Summit organised by the Organisation of Islamic Cooperation (OIC) in October 2003, Malaysian International Fireworks Competition in 2007 and 2008, Enthiran original motion picture soundtrack release in 2010 and 20th Gano Excel Internacional - Convención Global in 2015

Architecture 

The structure of the roof was designed similar to a folded origami to alleviate the plain roundness of the structure. From the front view, the building's eaves or wings are lifted at the sides, creating broad over hangings over the raking wall. Most of the walls are made of glass, so natural sunlight can easily illuminate the auditorium through the raked and shaded windows.

The roof structure, which is geometrically complex, covers the plenary hall and the column-free banquet hall.  The latter space can accommodate 3000 delegates, each with an uninterrupted view of the stage with the conference and main auditorium floors above supported on a sculptural system of radial arms.

Surrounding these main spaces the ancillary accommodation follows a conical geometry with the rings increasing in diameter up the building to provide the larger area needed for the plenary hall itself.

The main road leads to the convention centre over Seri Gemilang Bridge.

Interior 
The Plenary Hall, designed for major conferences, allows a capacity of up to 3,000 people with a podium stage. The Heads of States Hall has a circular seating arrangement for 180 people. Perdana Hall has an extensive kitchen serving 2,800 diners seated at any one time and, 2 unity halls that can each be divided for seminars, exhibitions or banquets for 2000 people. All the halls are equipped with interpreter rooms with 13 different languages. On top of that PICC also has 14 suites for bilateral meetings on various levels, VIP Lounges, 10 halls for conference discussions where each hall can accommodate 200 participants, 4 meeting rooms for 10 to 100 persons, 3 public galleries, restaurant, 2 prayer rooms and over 4 kiosks and a business centre for the delegates' convenience.

PICC has 2 major entrances, at the Ground and Mezzanine levels, a 2-level car park in the basement for 1,200, with lift access to all floors.

Notes

External links 

Putrajaya International Convention Centre (PICC) website

2003 establishments in Malaysia
Buildings and structures in Putrajaya
Convention centres in Malaysia
Tourist attractions in Putrajaya